Bruce Arnold  (born 6 September 1936 in London) is an English journalist and author who has lived in Ireland since 1957. His main expertise is in the fields of literary criticism and art criticism.

In 1983 it emerged that his telephone had been bugged by Charles Haughey in the Irish phone tapping scandal. He and the other bugged journalists were considered to have "anti-national" views.

Early life
Arnold was educated at Kingham Hill School and at Trinity College, Dublin, where he studied modern languages. His wife Mavis Arnold (née Ysabel Mavis Cleave) was also a journalist. Arnold's older brother Guy Arnold is also an author, largely on African politics.

Journalism
Arnold has worked for the main Irish newspapers based in Dublin – The Irish Times from 1965; The Irish Press and the Sunday Independent. He also acted as Dublin correspondent of The Guardian. He has edited Hibernia and the Dublin Magazine (1962–68; formerly The Dubliner).

Partial bibliography
(Fiction)
 A Singer at the Wedding (London: Hamish Hamilton 1978; rep. Abacus 1991);
 The Song of the Nightingale (London: Hamish Hamilton 1980; rep. Abacus 1991);
 The Muted Swan (London: Hamish Hamilton 1981; rep. Abacus 1991);
 Running to Paradise (London: Hamish Hamilton 1983; rep. Abacus 1991).

(Non-fiction) 
 A Concise History of Irish Art (London: Thames & Hudson, 1969; also New York: Praeger 1968)
 Orpen: Mirror to an Age ed. (London: Jonathan Cape, 1981)
 What Kind of Country? (London: Jonathan Cape, 1984)
 Margaret Thatcher: A Study in Power (London: Hamish Hamilton, 1984)
 An Art Atlas of Britain and Ireland (London: Penguin/Viking, 1991)
 William Orpen (Dublin: Town House, 1991)
 The Scandal of Ulysses (London: Sinclair Stevenson 1991; New York: St. Martin's Press 1992; Dublin: Liffey 2005)
 Mainie Jellett and the Modern Movement in Ireland (London: Yale UP 1991; New York: Yale UP, 1992)
 Haughey: His Life and Unlucky Deeds (London: HarperCollins, 1993)
 Swift: An Illustrated Life (Dublin: Lilliput, 1999)
 The Spire and Other Essays on Modern Irish Culture (foreword by Charles Lysaght) (Dublin: Liffey Press 2003)
 He That Is Down Need Fear No Fall (Ashfield Press, 2008)
 The Fight for Democracy: The Libertas Voice in Europe (2009) (about the Libertas Institute)
 The Irish Gulag: How the State Betrayed its Innocent Children (2009) (published just before the Commission to Inquire into Child Abuse report)
 Biography of Derek Hill (2010)
 The End of the Party with Jason O'Toole (Gill & MacMillan, 2011);

Film
 The Scandal of Ulysses; Images of Joyce
 To Make it Live: Mainie Jellett 1897–1944

Libretto
 A Passionate Man

Awards
He is an honorary Fellow of Trinity College Dublin, a Fellow of the Royal Society of Literature and an honorary member of the Royal Hibernian Academy. He was awarded an honorary doctorate by University College Dublin (UCD) and an OBE.

References

Sources
 
 

1936 births
Living people
Alumni of Trinity College Dublin
English art critics
English expatriates in Ireland
English magazine editors
English non-fiction writers
English political writers
Fellows of the Royal Society of Literature
People associated with University College Dublin
Sunday Independent (Ireland) people
The Guardian journalists
The Irish Press people
The Irish Times people
People educated at Kingham Hill School
Writers from London
English male non-fiction writers
English social commentators